Kotkoti (also Romanized as Kotkotī; also known as Kotkotī-ye Shīān) is a village in Shiyan Rural District, in the Central District of Eslamabad-e Gharb County, Kermanshah Province, Iran. At the 2006 census, its population was 264, in 59 families.

References 

Populated places in Eslamabad-e Gharb County